The Roman Catholic Diocese of Tenkodogo is a diocese located in the city of Tenkodogo in the Ecclesiastical province of Koupéla in Burkina Faso.

History
 February 11, 2012: Established as Diocese of Tenkodogo from the Archdiocese of Koupéla and the Diocese of Fada N’Gourma.

Leadership
 Bishops of Tenkodogo (Roman rite)
 Bishop Prosper Kontiebo (February 11, 2012- )

See also
Roman Catholicism in Burkina Faso

References

External links
 GCatholic.org

Tenkodogo
Christian organizations established in 2012
Tenkodogo, Roman Catholic Diocese of
Tenkodogo, Roman Catholic Diocese of
2012 establishments in Burkina Faso